Leo Richard Smith (August 31, 1905 – October 9, 1963) was an American prelate of the Roman Catholic Church. He served as bishop of the Diocese of Ogdensburg in New York for five months in 1963.  He previously served as an auxiliary bishop of the Diocese of Buffalo in New York from 1952 to 1963.

Biography

Early life 
Leo Smith was born on August 31, 1905, in Attica, New York to Adam Henry and Mary Jane (née O'Neil) Smith. He attended Canisius College in Buffalo, New York, where he obtained a Bachelor of Arts degree in 1926. He then furthered his studies in Rome, earning a Ph.D. from the Pontifical University of St. Thomas Aquinas (Angelicum) in 1928 and a Doctor of Sacred Theology from the Urban College of Propaganda in 1930.

Priesthood 
 He was ordained to the priesthood for the Diocese of Buffalo by Cardinal Basilio Pompili on December 21, 1929. He received a doctorate in canon and civil law in 1932.

Following his return to New York, Smith served as a curate at St. Joseph's Cathedral in Buffalo until 1934, when he became assistant chancellor of the diocese . He also served as diocesan director of the Confraternity of Christian Doctrine (1935-1941) and of youth activities (1941-1946). Smith was raised to the rank of papal chamberlain in 1942 and a domestic prelate in 1946. He was named chancellor (1946) and later vicar general (1953) of the diocese.

Auxiliary Bishop of Buffalo 
On June 30, 1952, Smith was appointed auxiliary bishop of the Diocese of Buffalo and Titular Bishop of Marida by Pope Pius XII. He received his episcopal consecration on September 24, 1952, from Archbishop Amleto Cicognani, with Bishops Raymond Kearney and James H. Griffiths serving as co-consecrators. He became episcopal moderator of the National Apostleship of the Sea in 1961.

Bishop of Ogdensburg 
Following the transfer of Bishop James Navagh to the Diocese of Paterson, Smith was named eighth bishop of the Diocese of Ogdensburg by Pope John XXIII on May 13, 1963. Leo Smith died on October 9, 1963, in Rome while attending the Second Vatican Council at age 58.

References

1905 births
1963 deaths
Canisius College alumni
Pontifical University of Saint Thomas Aquinas alumni
People from Attica, New York
Roman Catholic bishops of Ogdensburg
Participants in the Second Vatican Council
20th-century Roman Catholic bishops in the United States